Kurgash (Qurğaş) is a rural locality (a village) in Bakaldinsky Selsoviet, Arkhangelsky District, Bashkortostan, Russia. The population was 113 as of 2010. There are 3 streets.

Geography 
Kurgash is located 16 km east of Arkhangelskoye (the district's administrative centre) by road. Terekly is the nearest rural locality.

References 

Rural localities in Arkhangelsky District